Mapleton Falls is a national park near the town of Mapleton on the Blackall Range in South East Queensland, Australia,  north of Brisbane.  The falls are part of Pencil Creek and drop .

The waterfall became a forest reserve in 1938 and then in 1973 it was declared a national park.

Section 2 of the Sunshine Coast Hinterland Great Walk, a rugged long-distance walking track, passes through the park.  There are a number of smaller walks as well.

See also

 Protected areas of Queensland
 List of long-distance hiking tracks in Australia
 Long-distance trail
 List of long-distance trails
 Walking
 Hiking
 Backpacking

References

External links

 Mapleton Falls National Park

National Parks on the Sunshine Coast, Queensland
National parks of South East Queensland
Protected areas established in 1973
1973 establishments in Australia

Hiking and bushwalking tracks in Queensland